THC acetate ester (THC-O-acetate, THC acetate, O-acetyl-THC, THC-O, ATHC) is the acetate ester of THC. It is a potent synthetic homologue and a cannabinoid known to exhibit hallucinogenic effects that have been described as 300% more potent than THC. It is structurally identical to THC except for the addition of an ester group. It has been described by groups of varying expertise as having spiritual and psychedelic effects.

The term THC-O-acetate and its variations are commonly used for two types of the substance, dependent on which cannabinoid it is synthesized from. The difference between Δ8-THC derivatives (shown on the left image) and Δ9-THC derivatives (shown on the right image) is a bond on the top-left hydroxyl chain. Regardless of the derivative used, both are significantly more potent than THC.

On February 13, 2023, the Drug Enforcement Administration classified that Δ8-THC products were still legal, but upheld its position that THC-O-acetate is a federally prohibited Schedule I controlled substance in the United States. Additionally, though it is true that most THC-O-acetate is synthesized from natural cannabinoids found in hemp, the processes and catalysts involved are not. The classification may also be attributed to its toxicity potential, including scientific studies suggesting the possibility of producing ketene gas, a highly unstable reagent.

Physical data, chemistry, and properties

THC acetate ester (THC-O or THCOA) can be synthesized from THC, or from THCA.
The acetylation of THC does not change the properties of the compound to the same extent as with other acetate esters, as the parent compound (THC) is already highly lipophilic, but potency is nonetheless increased to some extent. While the acetate ester of Δ9-THC is the best studied, the acetate esters of other isomers, especially Δ8-THC but also Δ10-THC are also known, as are other esters such as THC-O-phosphate, THC hemisuccinate and THC morpholinylbutyrate.

History
THC acetate ester was investigated as a possible non-lethal incapacitating agent as part of the Edgewood Arsenal experiments at some point between 1949 and 1975. It was noted to have about twice the capacity to produce ataxia (lack of voluntary coordination of muscle movements) as did THC when administered to dogs.

Author D. Gold provided synthesis instructions for this compound (calling it "THC acetate") in his 1974 book Cannabis Alchemy: Art of Modern Hashmaking, in which it is described as follows;

The U.S. DEA first encountered THC-O-acetate as an apparent controlled substance analogue of THC in 1978. It was made in an analogous manner to how aspirin (acetylsalicylic acid) is made from willow bark (salicylic acid). The incident was described by Donald A. Cooper of the DEA thus: 

A similar case reported in June 1995 in the United Kingdom, and THC-O-acetate was ruled to be a Class A drug in that case. The description of that case appears to indicate the convicted manufacturer was using D. Gold's book Cannabis Alchemy as a guide.

THC acetate was also reported to have been found by New Zealand police in 1995, again made by acetylation of purified cannabis extracts with acetic anhydride.

Following legal changes in the USA since around 2018, especially the legalisation of cannabis in an increasing number of states and the passage of the 2018 Farm Bill which eased restrictions on the cultivation of industrial hemp, THC-O-acetate has become increasingly available as a recreational drug, initially in the USA but subsequently in other countries also. It may be produced from extracts of psychoactive strains of cannabis in states where this is permitted, in which case the product will be primarily O-acetyl-Δ9-THC, but it is also commonly produced from Delta-8-THC which is synthesised from cannabidiol extracted from hemp, in which case the product will be primarily O-acetyl-Δ8-THC. Since Δ9-THC and Δ8-THC are quite different in potency, the corresponding acetylated derivatives also will be, which may pose risks to consumers who are unaware of which isomer is in commercial products.

Concerns have also been raised about the lack of safety data or quality control testing given the limited history of human use and potentially toxic chemical reagents used during manufacture. The legal issue of whether purified THC-O-acetate is considered legal in jurisdictions where cannabis is legal is also complex and varies between jurisdictions.

Toxicity
Ketene gas is potentially lethal at 5 parts per million Some speculated that their productions in vape devices and cartridges was strongly suspected to be at least partially responsible for the deaths and permanent lung injuries seen during the EVALI crisis.

Some vendors (grey market or otherwise), primarily those with less income or professionalism, may have used, or still are using, potentially toxic or even carcinogenic adulterants sourced either from home or from certain synthesis companies using shady or downright illegal industrial practices.

Legal status

United Kingdom
THC-O-acetate is a Class B drug in the United Kingdom.

United States
THC-O-acetate is not directly listed under the Controlled Substances Act but is designated as a federally prohibited Schedule I controlled substance in the United States. It has mainly received this designation due to its status as a largely new experimental cannabinoid and a synthetic phytocannabinoid meaning it is not derived directly from the hemp plant. Adulterants and poisonous chemicals can be inserted to the product by less reputable manufacturers, along with its alleged possibilities for danger. it is considered an analog of THC, in which case purchase, sale, or possession could be prosecuted under the Federal Analog Act.

Despite not being listed in the federal controlled substance act directly by name, Terrence Boos the DEAs Chief Drug & Chemical Evaluation Section Diversion Control Division released a legal opinion in response to a letter asking to clarify legality.

"The CSA classifies tetrahydrocannabinols (THC) as controlled in schedule I. 21 U.S.C. § 812, Schedule I(c)(17); 21 CFR 1308.11(d)(31). Subject to limited exceptions, for the purposes of the CSA, the term "tetrahydrocannabinols" means those "naturally contained in a plant of the genus Cannabis (cannabis plant), as well as synthetic equivalents of the substances contained in the cannabis plant and/or synthetic substances, derivatives, and their isomers with similar chemical structure and pharmacological activity to those substances contained in the plant." 21 CFR §(d)(31).

Δ9-THC-O and Δ8-THC-O are tetrahydrocannabinols having similar chemical structures and pharmacological activities to those contained in the cannabis plant. Thus, Δ9-THC-O and Δ8-THC-O meet the definition of "tetrahydrocannabinols," and they (and products containing Δ9-THC-O and Δ8-THC-O) are controlled in schedule I by 21 U.S.C. § 812(c) Schedule I, and 21 CFR § 1308.11(d). The Controlled Substances Code Number (CSCN) assigned to these substances are 7370, which is that of tetrahydrocannabinols, and the conversion factors (CF) are 1.00. Because Δ9-THC-O and Δ8-THC-O are controlled substances, they do not meet the definition of controlled substance analogues under 21 U.S.C. § 813."

Although this may conflict with the federal definition of hemp which includes "(1) HEMP.—The term 'hemp' means the plant Cannabis sativa L. and any part of that plant, including the seeds thereof and all derivatives, extracts, cannabinoids, isomers, acids, salts, and salts of isomers, whether growing or not, with a Δ9-THC concentration of not more than 0.3 percent on a dry weight basis."

Its sudden status in the early 2020s as both a Schedule I and widely commercially distributed chemical is a heavily debated topic, most notably by the United States Ninth Circuit Court of Appeals, which made an opinion post that stated; products containing hemp-derived Δ8-THC may be lawfully used in commerce and eligible for trademark protection under the Lanham Act. Significantly, the court decided that downstream hemp-derived Δ8-THC products can fit within the legal definition of “hemp” under the Agricultural Improvement Act of 2018 so long as they consist of less than 0.3% Δ9-THC and are derived from hemp itself consisting of less than 0.3% Δ9-THC. Under the Controlled Substances Act and the 2018 Farm Bill, this would hypothetically make every hemp-derived product fully legal so long as it contained 0.3% or less of Δ9-THC in total, including Δ8-THC-O.

See also 
 Acetylation
 THC-O-phosphate 
 THC hemisuccinate 
 THC morpholinylbutyrate
 Nabitan
 O-1057
 O-2694

References 

Cannabinoids
Acetate esters
Benzochromenes
Prodrugs
Heterocyclic compounds with 3 rings